Cutral Có is a city in the Confluencia Department of Neuquén Province in Argentina. It is part of the statistical area formed with neighboring Plaza Huincul.

The settlement is located in the desert, it was founded in 1933 after the discovery of oil. The majority of the economy is based on the petrochemical industry. Cutral-Có is home to several multinational corporations such as Repsol-YPF and Petrobras.

Following the 1992 privatization of YPF, thousands of people lost their jobs in the city's important industrial action.

There are plans to transport water from the Río Neuquén in order to introduce agriculture to the region.

The city used to have its own airport.

Climate

References

External links
 Federal website
 Municipal website

Populated places in Neuquén Province
Populated places established in 1933
Cities in Argentina
Argentina
Neuquén Province